Angus Barnett (born 1963) is an English actor known for his role of Mullroy in the Pirates of the Caribbean film series and the British ITV series Dead Man Weds (2005).  He was born and brought up in Ruddington, Nottinghamshire and attended West Bridgford Comprehensive School. He trained as an actor at Bristol Old Vic Theatre School.

Theatre
In 1997 he was part of a hand-selected cast for the Japan-Thai Contemporary Theatre Joint Production of Red Demon in a joint production of the Japan Foundation and the Setagaya Public Theatre. The production was written and directed by Hideki Noda, and performed with a cast of 14 Thai actors and Barnett, carefully selected by Noda himself. It was first performed for three days at Theatre Tram at the end of 1997.

Film and television

Barnett has appeared in many television and film productions over the years, most usually in 'character roles' rather than starring ones. This has led to his being cast by many high-profile directors, including Gore Verbinski, Martin Scorsese, Bryan Singer, George Miller and Marc Forster. The director Nigel Cole, cast Barnett in three separate films, Calendar Girls, Made in Dagenham and The Wedding Video.

Filmography
Consuming Passions (1988) as Josiah's Son
Lorenzo's Oil (1992) as Suddaby's Junior Manager
Black Beauty (1994) as Ned Burnham
FairyTale: A True Story (1997) as Second Reporter
Uncle Gilbert & the Hurlo-Thrumbo (1997) as Bert
Sabotage! (2000) as Marvin
Pirates of the Caribbean: The Curse of the Black Pearl (2003) as Mullroy
Calendar Girls (2003) as Orchid Photographer
Finding Neverland (2004) as 'Nana' / Mr. Reilly
Colour Me Kubrick: A True...ish Story (2005) as Ace
Irish Jam (2006) as Milos O Shea
Copying Beethoven (2006) as Krenski
Sixty Six (2006) as Stan Shivers
Flood (2007) as Bill
Pirates of the Caribbean: At World's End (2007) as Mullroy
Seared (2008) as Policeman 1
St. Trinian's II: The Legend of Fritton's Gold (2009) as Drunken Sailor
Made in Dagenham (2010) as Passing Van Driver
Albatross (2011) as Man Guest
Hugo (2011) as Theatre Manager
The Wedding Video (2012) as Reverend Dobbs
Jack the Giant Slayer (2013) as Foe
Up All Night (2015) as Gene Peck
Pirates of the Caribbean: Dead Men Tell No Tales (2017) as Mullroy
Jellyfish (2018) as Vince
Trautmann (2019)
 Cottontail

Television
High & Dry (1987) as Trevor Archer
Hot Metal (1988) as Jezz
The Storyteller (1988) as Servant 1
Boon (1988) as Roger, Electrician
Square Deal (1988) as Alan 
Hannay (1989) as Cromwell Thorpe
Birds of a Feather (1991) as Video Repair Man
Adam Bede (1991) (TV film)
The Queen's Nose (1998 & 2000) as PC Williams
Alice in Wonderland (1999) (TV film) as Four Of Hearts
The Strangerers (2000) as Fluids
Shackleton (2002) (TV film) as Wounded Soldier
Outlaws (2004) as Ron the Con
Holby City (2004) as Ian Franklin
Dead Man Weds (2005) as Cliff the Clutch
M.I.High (2007) as Brent Gilbert
Miss Marie Lloyd - Queen of The Music Hall (2007) (TV film) as Mr. Belafonte
Christmas at the Riviera (2007) (TV film) as Ellis
Fairy Tales (2008) as Dr. Wolf
Skins (2008) as Big Bob
Massive (2008) as Nico
Little Dorrit (2008) as horsedealer Slingo
Crusoe (2008) as Isbister
Doctors (2009) as Micky Greening
The Gemma Factor (2010) as Kenny Grantham
Midsommer Murders (2011) as Kenny Pottinger

References

External links

Angus Barnett at the Online Movie Database
Angus Barnett at Hollywood.com
Angus Barnett at Filmbug.com

1963 births
Living people
English male film actors
English male television actors
English male stage actors
People from Ruddington
People educated at West Bridgford School